Velvi is a 2008 Indian Tamil-language thriller film written, produced and directed by Jeans. The film stars newcomers Vishwa and Hasini, with Madhan, Rajpal, Sakthi, Kadhal Sukumar, Agilan, Pandu, R. Sekhar and Sundari playing supporting roles. The film had musical score by J. K. Selva and was released on 10 October 2008.

Plot

The film begins with the murder of the rowdy Arumugam and the drug addict Mohan in a similar way. Inspector Rubesh (Agilan) finds that the two victims have met a woman just before their death and they were both law college students. Rubesh then interviews a college professor and he told him about an incident that happened a few months ago.

Chandru fell in love at first sight with Thulasi. The engineering student Chandru skipped his classes to meet Thulasi in her law college and posed as an apprentice lawyer, they eventually fell in love with each other. Meanwhile, Pulipandi, Arumugam and Mohan formed a small gang: they eve teased the college girls, ragged the boys and smoked ganja in the college. Afterwards, the straightforward Thulasi quarrelled with the three men for not respecting the college rules. One day, they eve teased Thulasi and she had the police arrest them.

Rubesh now knows that Pulipandi is the next victim but Thulasi kills him too. Rubesh finally arrests Thulasi for killing three persons. In court, Thulasi confesses that she was the murderer and didn't feel guilty of killing them. A few months ago, when Thulasi realised about Chandru's lies, she first felt revolted but then, Thulasi forgave him. They were eventually engaged and the day before their wedding, Thulasi was abducted by the three men and they brutally raped her. A physically and mentally weakened Thulasi returned the next day, but Chandru refused to marry her because she lost her virginity and was "impure" for him. Following this incident, her parents committed suicide. Thulasi decided to use her body as a weapon: she seduced the three men and had sex with them to gain their confidence. A vengeful Thulasi killed them cruelly and castrated them in due course. Thulasi then abducted Chandru and as he humiliated her for losing her virginity, she raped the virgin Chandru. In court, Thulasi mourns that the women are ill-treated by society for being raped and the judge sentences her to the death penalty.

Cast

Vishwa as Chandru
Hasini as Thulasi
Madhan as Pulipandi
Rajpal as Arumugam
Sakthi as 'Tape' Mohan
Kadhal Sukumar as Senthil
Agilan as Inspector Rubesh
Pandu as College professor
R. Sekhar as Thulasi's father
Sundari as Thulasi's mother
Madhan Bob as Tiger Dayanidhi
Nellai Siva as Police constable
Halwa Vasu as Police constable
Sethu Vinayagam as Public prosecutor
LIC Narasimhan as Judge
Amirthalingam
Appukutty as Chandru's friend

Production

Jeans, an engineer from the USA, made his directorial debut with the thriller film Velvi under the banner of The Fourth Dimension Academy. Newcomer Hasini, who was from Andhra Pradesh but was settled in Chennai right from her child hood, signed to play the heroine while newcomer Vishwa signed to play the male lead role. A host of new faces were cast to share the screen whereas actors Pandu, Kadhal Sukumar, Madhan Bob and Nellai Siva were chosen to add the comedy flavour. J. K. Selva composed the music, S. J. Star took care of camera work and the editing was by Sudarshan.

Soundtrack

The film score and the soundtrack were composed by J. K. Selva. The soundtrack, released in 2008, features 4 tracks with lyrics written by Gopaldhasan and Jeans.

References

2008 films
2000s Tamil-language films
Indian thriller films
Indian rape and revenge films
2008 directorial debut films
2008 thriller films